Vilma Pázmándy de Szomor et Somodor (1839–1919) was a Hungarian noblewoman, wife of Count Ödön Lónyay de Nagylónya et Vásárosnamény. She was a daughter of Dénes Pázmándy. Vilma Pázmándy and Ödön Lónyay had four children:

 Gábor (1861–1917)
 Elemér (1863–1946), second husband of Princess Stéphanie of Belgium
 Sarolta
 Vilma (1869-1897)

References
 Főapátsági gyűjtemények: Lónyay Ödönné, Pázmándy Vilma

1839 births
1919 deaths
Hungarian nobility
Vilma